A Woman's Experience is a 1919 silent film drama directed by Perry N. Vekroff and starring Sam Hardy and Mary Boland. It was filmed in 1918 and released in early 1919. This film is preserved by the Library of Congress.

Plot
As described in a film magazine, growing tired of the monotonous country life, George Roydant (Hardy) and his wife Agnes (Boland) move to the city, where they become involved in financial difficulties after the husband has an affair with an adventuress, Attlie Damuron (Uzzell). Agnes' name becomes coupled with that of a Count, and when she learns of her husband's duplicity, she turns to the Count. The Count attempts to force his attentions on her and in his excitement accidentally drinks a cup of poison and dies in her room. She is saved from being suspected in his death because of a note found in the room. George and Agnes realize their mistakes and go back to the quiet and peace of the country.

Cast
 Sam Hardy as George Roydant
 Mary Boland as Agnes Roydant
 Lawrence McGill as Nicholas Barrable
 Robert Cain as Lord Sulgrave
 Corrine Uzzell as Attlie Damuron
 Bradley Barker as Rufford

References

External links

 
 

1919 films
American silent feature films
Films directed by Perry N. Vekroff
American films based on plays
Silent American drama films
1919 drama films
American black-and-white films
1910s English-language films
1910s American films